Beulah Hubbard High School was a public high school in Little Rock, Mississippi. In 1990 it was one of the schools merged to create Newton County High School. The school teams were called the "Rebels."

References 

Education in Newton County, Mississippi
Defunct schools in Mississippi
Public high schools in Mississippi